1022 Olympiada, provisional designation , is a background asteroid from the central regions of the asteroid belt, approximately  in diameter. It was discovered at the Simeiz Observatory on the Crimean peninsula on 23 June 1924, by Soviet astronomer Vladimir Albitsky, who named it after his mother, Olimpiada Albitskaya. The X-type asteroid has a short rotation period of 3.83 hours.

Orbit and classification 

Olympiada is a non-family asteroid from the main belt's background population. It orbits the Sun in the central asteroid belt at a distance of 2.3–3.3 AU once every 4 years and 8 months (1,716 days; semi-major axis of 2.81 AU). Its orbit has an eccentricity of 0.17 and an inclination of 21° with respect to the ecliptic.

Naming 

This minor planet was named after Olimpiada Albitskaya, mother of the discoverer Vladimir Albitsky (1891–1952). No accurate naming citation was given for this asteroid in The Names of the Minor Planets. The author of the Dictionary of Minor Planets, Lutz Schmadel, learned about the naming circumstances from Nikolai Chernykh (1931–2004), a prolific long-time astronomer at Nauchnij, Crimea.

Physical characteristics 

In the SMASS classification, Olympiada is an X-type asteroid.

Rotation period 

Several rotational lightcurves of Olympiada have been obtained from photometric observations by American astronomer Brian Warner at his Palmer Divide Observatory in Colorado. Analysis of the best-rated lightcurve from April 2008 gave a rotation period of 3.833 hours with a consolidated brightness variation between 0.27 and 0.66 magnitude, while the period of his first 1999-observation was later revised from 4.589 to 3.822 hours. For an asteroid of its size, it has a rather fast spin-rate.

This period is also in good agreement with other observations obtained by astronomers at the Belgrade Astronomical Observatory (3.8331 h; Δ0.35 mag) in March 2008, by astronomers at the Palomar Transient Factory (3.835 h; Δ0.46 mag) in January 2012, and by a group of Italian astronomers (3.834 h; Δ0.66 mag) in March 2017.

Poles 

In 2011, a modeled lightcurve using data from the Uppsala Asteroid Photometric Catalogue  and other sources gave a concurring sidereal period 3.83359 hours, as well as two poles at (46.0°, 10.0°) and (242.0°, 52.0°) in ecliptic coordinates (λ, β). Brian Warner also determined two spin axes at (40.0°, 18.0°) and (250.0°, 71.0°) using his data set from 2008.

Diameter and albedo 

According to the surveys carried out by the Infrared Astronomical Satellite IRAS, the Japanese Akari satellite and the NEOWISE mission of NASA's Wide-field Infrared Survey Explorer, Olympiada measures between 26.39 and 34.30 kilometers in diameter  and its surface has an albedo between 0.105 and 0.1600.

The Collaborative Asteroid Lightcurve Link derives an untypically high albedo of 0.2069 and a diameter of 26.65 kilometers based on an absolute magnitude of 10.2.

Notes

References

External links 
 Asteroid Lightcurve Database (LCDB), query form (info )
 Dictionary of Minor Planet Names, Google books
 Asteroids and comets rotation curves, CdR – Geneva Observatory, Raoul Behrend
 Discovery Circumstances: Numbered Minor Planets (1)-(5000) – Minor Planet Center
 
 

001022
Discoveries by Vladimir Albitsky
Named minor planets
001022
19240623